Amboyna Cay, also known as ; ; Datu Kalantiaw Island; Mandarin , and other names, is an island of the Spratly Islands group in the South China Sea located just outside (SW) of the southwest of Dangerous Ground. It is SW of Barque Canada Reef, south of the London Reefs, and NW of Swallow Reef.

The island has two parts: the eastern part consists of sand and coral, and the west part is covered with guano. It has a fringing reef. There is little vegetation. It is described by some as heavily fortified. A lighthouse has been operational on the island since May 1995.

The island is also claimed by China, Malaysia, the Philippines and Taiwan.

Recent history

From 1956 on, in the face of Chinese and Philippine opposition, the Republic of Vietnam Navy began to launch various operations to reassert
control over the Spratly Islands. Crewmembers erected sovereignty steles on almost all of them and built poles to hoist the Vietnamese flag. The cruiser
Tuy Dong (HQ-04) was assigned these missions in August 1956.

On 20 May 1963, the Republic of Vietnam Navy landed on Amboyna Cay and rebuilt the sovereignty stele.

On 28 April 1975, the Vietnam People's Navy landed on Amboyna Cay but later left the cay due to harsh climate.

In 1978 the Royal Malaysian Navy landed on the island and placed markers. However, the markers were subsequently destroyed by Vietnam People's Navy who has returned and occupied the cay since 10 March 1978.

On 31 March 1979, forces occupying the cay fired warning shots at a boat transporting six amateur radio operators ("hams") attempting a DX-pedition to Amboyna Cay.

In 1982, a Singapore yacht operated by the owner and his wife transporting four German hams on a DX-pedition to Amboyna Cay was fired upon by Vietnamese forces. One of the hams, Diethelm Mueller, was hit by an artillery round and fell overboard. The yacht burned and the rest of the party drifted for 11 days on debris. Another ham, Gero Band, died of thirst the day before the survivors were rescued by a passing Japanese freighter which took them to Hong Kong.

See also
Spratly Islands dispute

References

External links
Maritime Transparency Initiative Island Tracker

Islands of the Spratly Islands